Skipping may refer to:

 The hippity-hoppity gait that comes naturally to children
 A game or form of exercise using a skipping rope
 Exon skipping, in molecular biology
 Stone skipping, throwing a stone so that it bounces off the surface of water
 String skipping, a guitar-playing technique
 Snowmobile skipping, a sport where drivers hydroplane snowmobiles on lakes or rivers
 British slang for dumpster diving
 an episode of the television series Teletubbies
 a song by the band Associates from their 1982 album Sulk
 Truancy

See also
 
 Skip (disambiguation)
 Oswald Skippings (born 1953), former Chief Minister of the Turks and Caicos Islands